= Karadiguddi =

- Village
- Country: India
- State: Karnataka
- District: Belgaum
- Talukas: Belgaum

Languages
  - Official: Kannada
- Time zone: UTC+5:30 (IST)

Karadiguddi is a census village in Belgaum district in Karnataka, India. It has a population of 4000 and it also has gram panchayat. People in the village are dependent on the business with Belagavi, making itself one of the suburban centres; it is located just 9 km (5.6 mi) from Belagavi airport. Karadiguddi hosts mass marriages at the time of village fairs. One of the main attractions of the village is having a lake surrounded by curvilinear roads, which makes it look pretty good. Along with this it hosts a yearly fair of Makar sankranti, at which people from neighboring villages and from abroad come and take the holy Dip in the stream and get rid of all bad deeds of their life.
